Pavel Aleksandrovich Nesterov (born 8 April 1962; died 28 July 2005) was a Russian football player.

Honours
Soviet Cup finalist: 1990.

References

1962 births
People from Krasnogorsk, Moscow Oblast
2005 deaths
Soviet footballers
Russian footballers
PFC CSKA Moscow players
FC Lokomotiv Moscow players
Association football defenders
FC Neftekhimik Nizhnekamsk players
FC Iskra Smolensk players
Sportspeople from Moscow Oblast